Junqan Rural District is in Junqan District of Farsan County, Chaharmahal and Bakhtiari province, Iran. At the census of 2006, its constituent villages were in the Central District. There were 1,225 inhabitants in 346 households at the following census of 2011, by which time Junqan District had been established with two rural districts and two cities. At the most recent census of 2016, the population of the rural district was 2,750 in 816 households. The largest of its four villages was Rastab, with 1,582 people.

References 

Farsan County

Rural Districts of Chaharmahal and Bakhtiari Province

Populated places in Chaharmahal and Bakhtiari Province

Populated places in Farsan County

fa:دهستان جونقان